The Kentani dwarf chameleon (Bradypodion kentanicum) occurs in coastal area of the Eastern Cape, South Africa.

References

 Tolley, K. and Burger, M. 2007. Chameleons of Southern Africa. .

External links
 Search for Distribution of Bradypodion kentanicum

Bradypodion
Reptiles described in 1935
Taxa named by John Hewitt (herpetologist)